Renai Caruso is an Australian actress.  A graduate of Queensland University of Technology, she has appeared on shows such as Neighbours and Satisfaction.

Career
Her notable roles have been Tess in Satisfaction, Rebecca 'Bec' Quilter in Out of the Blue and Olivia Rezzara in Neighbours.

Filmography

References

External links 

Australian film actresses
Australian television actresses
Living people
Queensland University of Technology alumni
1981 births
Australian people of Serbian descent